Allotalanta clonomicta is a moth in the family Cosmopterigidae. It was described by Edward Meyrick in 1927. It is found in South Africa.

References

Endemic moths of South Africa
Moths described in 1927
Cosmopteriginae
Moths of Africa